Jin Hongguang (May 9, 1957 – ) is a Chinese physical chemist, fellow of the Chinese Academy of Sciences.

Biography
Jin Hongguang was born in Changchun, Jilin Province on May 9, 1957. Both of his parents are Korean medical doctors. He grew up in local Korean schools. In 1978, he took the National College Entrance Examination after the Cultural Revolution. Despite the language barriers, he was admitted to Northeast Electric Power University.

After graduation in 1982, he became a researcher at Institute of Engineering Thermophysics, Chinese Academy of Sciences and completed his master's degree there from August 1986 to January 1990. In 1991, he went to Tokyo Institute of Technology with a United Nations Development Programme (UNDP) scholarship, and obtained his doctorate in 1994. Afterwards, he became a Tokyo Tech Associate Professor.

In 1998，He was honored as a Distinguished Young Scholar by the National Science Fund for Distinguished Young Scholars. He returned to China next year to lead Program 973 research projects. He was elected as a fellow of Chinese Academy of Sciences in 2013.

Awards and honors
Distinguished Young Scholar by the National Science Fund for Distinguished Young Scholars - 1999
Program 973 leading scientist - 1999
National Natural Science Award - 2009
Ho Leung Ho Lee Foundation Science and Technology Progress Award - 2011 
Fellow of Chinese Academy of Sciences - 2013

References

Living people
1957 births
Members of the Chinese Academy of Sciences
Chinese people of Korean descent
People from Changchun
Tokyo Institute of Technology alumni